Northern Powerhouse Rail (NPR), sometimes referred to unofficially as High Speed 3, is a proposed major rail programme designed to substantially enhance the economic potential of the North of England. The phrase was adopted in 2014 for a project featuring new and significantly upgraded railway lines in the region. The aim is to transform rail services between the major towns and cities, requiring the region's single biggest transport investment since the Industrial Revolution. The original scheme would have seen a new high-speed rail line from Liverpool to Warrington continuing to join the HS2 tunnel which it would share into Manchester Piccadilly station. From there, the line would have continued to Leeds with a stop at Bradford. The line was intended to improve journey times and frequency between major Northern cities as well as creating more capacity for local service on lines that express services would have been moved out from.

However, in 2021, the Johnson government significantly curtailed the scheme in the Integrated Rail Plan for the North and Midlands (IRP). Under the IRP the existing lines  to Warrington from Liverpool will be upgraded, using the southern Liverpool–Manchester line. Instead of building a dedicated high speed line to Leeds via Bradford the scaled back scheme will only provide dedicated high speed rail track from Manchester as far as Marsden, West Yorkshire, where the line will join the upgraded TransPennine line to Leeds via Huddersfield.

In July 2022 the House of Commons Transport Committee expressed concern that the evidence base for the IRP was insufficient and made a number of specific comments. These included that 

In October 2022, early on in her short-lived Premiership, Liz Truss said that her government's plans for Northern Powerhouse Rail meant a full new high-speed rail line all the way from Liverpool to Hull with a stop at a new station in Bradford. The succeeding government said in its November 2022 financial statement that only the 'core' parts of NPR would be funded. The project is classified as an England and Wales project, facing criticism from some Welsh politicians.

NPR forms part of High Speed North, the overarching proposal that includes improvements to both roads and rail. These developments are designed to improve transport connections between major northern English cities and transport hubs, including Liverpool, Manchester, Manchester Airport, Leeds, Bradford, Huddersfield, Doncaster, Sheffield, York, Newcastle and Hull, as well as other significant economic centres.

History

Background

The High Speed North project aims to improve public transport journey times between the major cities in the North of England. Present-day rail connections between cities such as Liverpool, Manchester and Leeds are slow compared to commuter journeys across Greater London. By improving transport connections, it is proposed that commuters will be able to travel to work more freely, allowing these cities to compete together as one large single economy, rather than competing against one another. The NPR scheme is promoted by the combined public transport authority Transport for the North (TfN) and, according to analysis by TfN, currently fewer than 10,000 people in the North can access four or more of the North's largest economic centres within 60minutes. This could rise to around 1.3 million once High Speed North is fully delivered.

A plan to improve rail journey times in northern England, the Northern Hub, or, as currently called, the Great North Rail Project, was developed from a 2009 scheme to improve the rail network around Manchester. Schemes to improve the Leeds–Manchester line speed by 2014 were included in Network Rail's CP5 improvements, with an aim to reduce Manchester–Leeds journey times by 15minutes. In 2011, the approximately £290million electrification of the trans-Pennine Manchester–Leeds line was given funding. Work started on the electrification in 2013.

HS3 name

NPR has often been referred to in the press as "High Speed 3" or "HS3", in reference to the development of high-speed rail in the United Kingdom. The first high-speed railway line to be built in Britain was High Speed 1 (HS1), the route connecting London to the Channel Tunnel, which opened 2003–2007. The southern phase of a second high-speed line named High Speed 2 (HS2), which is planned to eventually run from London to Manchester and the East Midlands, is currently being constructed and is scheduled to come into service in the late 2020s. The HS3 designation implies the development of a third high-speed rail route.

Historically, the use of the term High Speed 3 has been loose—the House of Lords' Economic Affairs Committee (March 2015) stated that there was no firm definition of the route implied by HS3:

In June 2014, at a speech given at the Manchester Museum of Science and Industry, the incumbent Chancellor of the Exchequer, George Osborne, proposed a high speed rail link between Leeds and Manchester; the line would utilise the existing route between Leeds and Manchester, with additional tunnels and other infrastructure. Osborne argued that the northern cities' influence was comparatively less than London's and that the link would promote economies of agglomeration.

Osborne suggested the line should be considered as part of a review of the second phase of High Speed 2. Initial estimates suggested a rail line with a  line speed, and Leeds–Manchester journey times reduced to 30minutes. Osborne estimated the cost to be less per mile than that of HS2, giving a cost of under £6billion. Initial responses to the proposal were mixed: Jeremy Acklam of the Institution of Engineering and Technology (IET) suggested that planners should look at connecting other northern cities such as Liverpool, and potentially North East England via York; commentators noted that the proposal could be viewed as an attempt to gain political support in the north of England in the run-up to the 2015 general election: the Institute of Economic Affairs characterised the proposal as a "headline grabbing vanity project designed to attract votes". The British Chambers of Commerce, Confederation of British Industry and others were cautiously positive about the proposal, but emphasised the need to deliver on existing smaller scale schemes.

Support and development
On 5 August 2014, an alliance of six city councils—Leeds, Liverpool, Hull, Manchester, Newcastle upon Tyne and Sheffield—unveiled an initial regional transport plan linking their cities called 'One North'. This plan incorporated a new  trans-Pennine high speed rail link connecting to the northern branches of HS2 at Manchester and Leeds (30-minute journey time), together with other regional rail developments, and the bringing forward of the construction of the northern part of HS2, as part of a regional transport plan including other road, intermodal port, and rail freight improvements. The estimated cost of the high-speed Manchester–Leeds rail link was circa over £5bn, with a proposed completion date of 2030; the entire project was costed at £10bn to £15bn. George Osborne attended the project launch, and provided his backing for the project. A report Rebalancing Britain published by High Speed Two Limited in late 2014 also acknowledged the need for improved east–west transportation links in northern England, and recommended the progressing of the schemes in the 'One North' report.

The proposals included new-build routes between the major northern cities, with cost estimates from £5bn to £19bn, and estimated journey times of one half to two thirds of current routes; alternative upgrades of existing routes were costed in the £1bn to £7bn range, and had lesser journey time reductions, of the order of 10–15minutes; the proposals were in addition to existing High Speed 2 route options for Liverpool and Sheffield-Leeds. The development options were planned for Network Rail Control Period 6 (2019–24).

In March 2016, the newly established governmental advisory body, the National Infrastructure Commission (NIC), chaired by Lord Adonis, reported on transport infrastructure projects in the north of England. It recommended bringing forward HS3 proposals, beginning with the Manchester–Leeds section. The NIC's report, High Speed North stated that "It takes longer to get from Liverpool to Hull by train than to travel twice the distance from London to Paris". It also recommended collaboration between TfN and HS2 Ltd on the design of the northern parts of HS2; and on the design of the improved Manchester Piccadilly station, together with Manchester City Council and other rail bodies. The Report suggested the development of a HS3 link after the completion of Network Rail's £2bn trans-Pennine electrification upgrade (scheduled to take place between 2015 and 2022, leading to 40-minute journey times). A report by Arup commissioned by the NIC studied additional improvements on the Manchester–Leeds route, focussing on the Diggle route (via Huddersfield) utilising disused track plus new-build tunnels, and identified potential journey time savings of between 1 and 10minutes. A preliminary study by Network Rail did not rule out that the aspirational Leeds–Manchester journey time of 30minutes could be achieved on the Calder Valley route. TfN's aspirational Manchester–Manchester Airport and Leeds–Sheffield journey times were identified as being achievable by the HS2 scheme, with modifications to through running to Sheffield city centre. At the 2016 Budget, the Chancellor of the Exchequer, George Osborne, endorsed the general proposals by the National Infrastructure Commission for a high speed line between only Manchester and Leeds, with an aim of reducing journey times to 30minutes between the two destinations.

In August 2016, the Institute of Public Policy Research urged the Government to prioritise HS3 over HS2.

In August 2017, the former chancellor, George Osborne called for the Government to commit to NPR following backing of Crossrail 2 and scrapping of electrification schemes in July 2017.

Later development

Transport for the North is developing the NPR programme and is considering how the network forms part of the existing and future rail network of the north. £60M of funding was provided to generate plans for a route by 2017.

In October 2017, the then Chancellor Philip Hammond allocated £300M to future-proof junctions between NPR and HS2, to allow east–west services to use HS2 infrastructure. Later in the same month, it was proposed that an underground station for  should be built to accommodate the new services of up to eight trains per hour; an underground station would require less building work and still provide good links to HS2.

In December 2017, TfN announced a proposal for a new project called NPR. On 16 January 2018, TfN released their draft 30-year Strategic Transport Plan of staged developments for northern England. It included NPR with proposals for
 a new line between Liverpool and the HS2 Manchester Spur via Warrington
 capacity at Manchester Piccadilly station for around eight through services per hour
 a new Trans Pennine rail line that connects Manchester and Leeds via Bradford (which currently has no through station, see below)
 significant upgrades along the corridor of the existing Hope Valley line between Sheffield and Manchester via Stockport
 Leeds to Sheffield delivered through HS2 Phase 2B and upgrading the route from Sheffield
 Leeds to Newcastle via HS2 junction and upgrades to the East Coast Main Line
 significant upgrades to existing line from Leeds to Hull (via Selby) and Sheffield to Hull (via Doncaster)

The outcome of the consultation on the draft Strategic Transport Plan should be an Outline Business Case, that was to have been submitted by the end of 2018.

At Manchester Piccadilly, it is likely a new NPR station will be needed and options include a new underground station or a new surface turnback station. Between Manchester and Sheffield, TfN is currently looking at whether it can upgrade the existing line or whether a new line will be needed. Again, a Strategic Outline Business Case for NPR was to have been completed by the end of 2018, which was then delayed until 2020. This was then further delayed until the publishing of the Integrated Rail Plan (IRP) in November 2021. As well as a through station for Bradford, there have been calls for an additional station at Rochdale on the new line between Manchester and Leeds.

NPR is being developed in addition to planned improvements including the Great North Rail Project. HS2 Ltd and Network Rail have been commissioned by TfN to prepare engineering and costing studies on a range of rail infrastructure options. This could involve new and upgraded rail infrastructure. In addition to serving the six previously identified centres, work is also underway to develop options to serve Other Significant Economic Centres (OSECs). Options for NPR stations will also promote and integrate with masterplans and wider spatial plans, including Leeds Station and Manchester Piccadilly.

In March 2019, it was announced a new commission had been established to plan a new £6bn city centre station in Liverpool to accommodate HS2 and NPR services.

In July 2019, the then Prime Minister Boris Johnson pledged to fund the Leeds to Manchester section of the NPR route as a first stage of NPR. It was also revealed that the plans would be published in the Autumn 2019, after the review of HS2 had concluded. However, in September 2019, the NPR minister Jake Berry MP stated that a possible underground interchange at Manchester Piccadilly would inflate the cost of the project and lead to an offset of spend somewhere else on the project: "...spending an extra £6bn on that [Manchester Piccadilly underground] means we have to find £6bn that we won’t spend somewhere else - and that might be putting in the parkway station in Bradford. The people of Bradford, if they want to get to Leeds or Manchester, [would] have to get in their car and what we have to absolutely be doing is stopping people getting in their car."

The site of a new through station at Bradford has been earmarked to be located on the current St James' Market, itself built upon the former Adolphus Street station site. The current food market, which is said to have outgrown the site, would be moved elsewhere. There has been no detail of exactly how the railway lines would access the station, however, the railway part of Bradford Interchange would close.

On 17 March 2023, the project was classified by HM Treasury as an "England and Wales" project, although no infrastructure for the project would be in Wales. As a result of the classification, Wales would not receive a Barnett consequential of funding, estimated to be £1 billion, unlike Scotland and Northern Ireland. The UK Government said it would state the benefits in "due course" and it is "responsible for heavy rail infrastructure across England and Wales", therefore it spends the money directly for Wales rather than provide funds to the Welsh Government. Plaid Cymru described the decision as a push of "blatant lies", that the project "harms the Welsh economy" and that rail infrastructure should be devolved to Wales. The Welsh Liberal Democrats stated it is "very clearly not [an] England and Wales" project. The Welsh Government stated it should be classed as "England-only" and the current classification was "wrong".

Summary of options
In the Technical Annex to the IRP the TfN proposals that had been considered were summarised as three options.

The IRP chose Option 1.

Curtailment
In November 2021, the proposals were substantially curtailed with the publication of the Integrated Rail Plan for the North and Midlands (IRP). It contained the proviso that:  It announced the cancellation of the eastern leg of the HS2 project, and that NPR would be slimmed down. The rest of the line would be developed on existing routes, from Liverpool to Warrington using the southern Liverpool–Manchester line and from Marsden to Leeds using the TransPennine line. 

The benefits of this plan compared to the previous proposals are stated as being that it would:
 deliver benefits sooner, including decarbonisation of the Transpennine corridor;
 deliver improvements to transport between Leeds and Bedford sooner;
 provide improved connectivity within West Yorkshire;
 offer better value for money;
 allow for a more staged construction schedule;
 if a third track is provided between Marsden and Huddersfield, it would support hourly freight paths, and once gauge clearance had been achieved, an hourly off-peak freight path;
 journey times to London and across the NPR core network will be similar to or faster than the original HS2 and NPR plans.

This announcement met with anger and disappointment from the Board of Transport for the North. However, they expressed a desire to work with the government. They laid out a number of criticisms.
 the plan would not deliver the long-term changes needed to level up the North’s economy.
 sharing capacity between inter-city, regional, local and freight services produces substantial operational problems and risks.
 the plan would only provide eight fast trains per hour between Leeds and Manchester compared with the twelve provided by TfN's preferred option.
 the proposed line upgrades would cause much greater disruption than constructing new lines.
 as the seventh most populous local authority area in England, Bradford would continue to have no direct rail access to Liverpool, Sheffield, Newcastle, Hull or Manchester Airport.
 as a key destination, Liverpool has insufficient capacity with just Lime Street Station.
 the limitation of six trains per hour on the East Coast Main Line could be removed by re-opening the mothballed Leamside line.
 it is important that connectivity is improved between (a) Sheffield and Leeds; (b) Sheffield and Manchester; (c) Sheffield and Hull; (d) Leeds and Hull; (e) and that Hull and the East Riding are reconnected to the Transpennine Main Line
 electrification should be reinstated as part of improved East West decarbonised freight and passenger connectivity.

Doubt has been cast on the magnitude of the reduction in journey times claimed.

See also
 High speed rail in the United Kingdom
 Woodhead line
 Huddersfield Line
 The Northern Way
 Northern Powerhouse
 TransPennine Route Upgrade
 UK Ultraspeed

References

Sources

Proposed railway lines in England
High-speed railway lines in the United Kingdom
Northern England
Rail infrastructure in the United Kingdom